Kamal Ameer Bey (born January 3, 1998) is an American Greco-Roman wrestler. He holds multiple gold medals in competitions such as the World Championships (junior level), US Nationals, Cerro Pelado and more.

High school 
Bey attended Oak Park and River Forest High School until his junior year, where he was mostly known for his success in Greco-Roman rather than in folkstyle. During his high school years (13'-15'), he was a USAW National Champion (three-time All-American) and a state champion. In August 2015, he opted to drop out of high school while having twelfth grade (15'-16') remaining to focus in Greco-Roman and move to the United States Olympic Training Center in Colorado.

Greco-Roman

Cadet & Junior 
Since arriving to the OTC in 2016, he became a UWW National Champion and once again placed at the Fargo Nationals. He went on to represent the United States in 2016, 2017 and 2018 at the Junior World Championships, placing eight, first and fifth respectively.

Senior 
In 2016 he placed fourth at the Dave Schultz M. International and claimed a Bill Farrell M. International title. In December, he represented USA at the Club World Championships after winning the US Open and helped the team to place eleventh.

In 2017 he won a Dave Schultz M. International title, placed second at the US Open, third at the Zagreb Grand Prix, and twenty first at the U23 World Championships.

In 2018 he claimed championships at the US Open, Cerro Pelado International and Bill Farrell International. He also competed at the Pan American Championships but was forced to pull out of the tournament after he suffered an injury in his first match. He then went on to place seventeenth at the Germany Grand Prix after losing in the first round. In his final competition of the year, Bey competed at the World Championships, where he placed seventh.

In 2019 he claimed his second Dave Schultz M. International championship, his second-straight US Open championship, placed second at the Pan American Championships and made it to Final X, where he fell short. In December, he won the US National Championship and qualified for the Olympic Trials.

In 2020 he placed seventh at the Matteo Pellicone Ranking Series and he was then scheduled to compete at the 20' US Olympic Team Trials on April 4–5 at State College, Pennsylvania. However, the event was postponed for 2021 along with the Summer Olympics due to the COVID-19 pandemic, leaving all the qualifiers unable to compete.

On October 30, 2020, it was announced by the United States Anti-Doping Agency that Bey had accepted a one-year long suspension, after failing to properly inform and maintain his whereabouts information, missing his opportunity to compete at the 2020 Summer Olympics.

Controversies 
On February 9–10, 2019, Bey competed against Rafael Iunusov in the quarterfinals of the Zagreb Grand Prix. While down 2 points to 6, Bey attacked Iunusov with a right hook to the chin at the end of the match, this led to a disqualification loss. He was not suspended and competed days later at the Hungary Grand Prix.

Greco-Roman record 

! colspan="7"| Senior Greco-Roman Matches
|-
!  Res.
!  Record
!  Opponent
!  Score
!  Date
!  Event
!  Location
|-
! style=background:white colspan=7 |
|-
|Loss
|54-17
|align=left| Wuileixis Rivas
|style="font-size:88%"|5-7
|style="font-size:88%" rowspan=2|January 15–18, 2020
|style="font-size:88%" rowspan=2|2020 Matteo Pellicone Ranking Series
|style="text-align:left;font-size:88%;" rowspan=2|
 Rome, Italy
|-
|Win
|54-16
|align=left| Nurbek Khashimbekov
|style="font-size:88%"|TF 14-5
|-
! style=background:white colspan=7 |
|-
|Win
|53-16
|align=left| Jake Fisher
|style="font-size:88%"|5-1
|style="font-size:88%" rowspan=5|December 20–22, 2019
|style="font-size:88%" rowspan=5|2019 Senior Nationals - US Olympic Trials Qualifier
|style="text-align:left;font-size:88%;" rowspan=5|
 Fort Worth, Texas
|-
|Win
|52-16
|align=left| Corey Hope
|style="font-size:88%"|TF 14-1
|-
|Win
|51-16
|align=left| Alex Mossing
|style="font-size:88%"|TF 10-1
|-
|Win
|50-16
|align=left| Timothy Johnson Thompson
|style="font-size:88%"|Fall
|-
|Win
|49-16
|align=left| Anthonie Linares
|style="font-size:88%"|TF 10-0
|-
! style=background:white colspan=7 | 
|-
|Loss
|48-16
|align=left| Pat Smith
|style="font-size:88%"|3-6
|style="font-size:88%" rowspan=3|June 7–8, 2019 
|style="font-size:88%" rowspan=3|2019 Final X: Rutgers
|style="text-align:left;font-size:88%;" rowspan=3|
 Piscataway, New Jersey
|-
|Loss
|48-15
|align=left| Pat Smith 
|style="font-size:88%"|1-2
|-
|Win
|48-14
|align=left| Pat Smith
|style="font-size:88%"|TF 11-2
|-
! style=background:white colspan=7 | 
|-
|Win
|47-14
|align=left| Pat Smith
|style="font-size:88%"|7-5
|style="font-size:88%" rowspan=5|April 27–29, 2019 
|style="font-size:88%" rowspan=5|2019 US Open Championships
|style="text-align:left;font-size:88%;" rowspan=5|
 Las Vegas, Nevada
|-
|Win
|46-14
|align=left| Peyton Walsh 
|style="font-size:88%"|TF 10-1
|-
|Win
|45-14
|align=left| Fritz Schierl
|style="font-size:88%"|TF 12-0
|-
|Win
|44-14
|align=left| Burke Paddock
|style="font-size:88%"|TF 14-0
|-
|Win
|43-14
|align=left| Joseph Cornejo
|style="font-size:88%"|TF 8-0
|-
! style=background:white colspan=7 |
|-
|Loss
|42-14
|align=left| Yosvanys Peña
|style="font-size:88%"|1-3
|style="font-size:88%" rowspan=4|April 18–21, 2019
|style="font-size:88%" rowspan=4|2019 Pan American Wrestling Championships
|style="text-align:left;font-size:88%;" rowspan=4|
 Buenos Aires, Argentina
|-
|Win
|42-13
|align=left| David Choc
|style="font-size:88%"|5-3
|-
|Win
|41-13
|align=left| Juan Angel Escobar
|style="font-size:88%"|TF 10-0
|-
|Win
|40-13
|align=left| Enrique Cuero
|style="font-size:88%"|TF 8-0
|-
! style=background:white colspan=7 |
|-
|Loss
|39-13
|align=left| László Szabó
|style="font-size:88%"|2-4
|style="font-size:88%" rowspan=2|February 23–24, 2019
|style="font-size:88%" rowspan=2|2019 Hungarian Grand Prix - Polyák Imre Memorial
|style="text-align:left;font-size:88%;" rowspan=2|
 Győr, Hungary
|-
|Win
|39-12
|align=left| Leo Drmola
|style="font-size:88%"|TF 11-0
|-
! style=background:white colspan=7 |
|-
|Loss
|38-12
|align=left| Rafael Iunusov
|style="font-size:88%"|DQ
|style="font-size:88%" rowspan=2|February 9–10, 2019
|style="font-size:88%" rowspan=2|2019 Grand Prix of Zagreb Open
|style="text-align:left;font-size:88%;" rowspan=2|
 Zagreb, Croatia
|-
|Win
|38-11
|align=left| Riccardo Vito Abbrescia
|style="font-size:88%"|7-3
|-
! style=background:white colspan=7 |
|-
|Win
|37-11
|align=left| Carter Nielsen
|style="font-size:88%"|6-4
|style="font-size:88%" rowspan=3|January 24–26, 2019
|style="font-size:88%" rowspan=3|2019 Dave Schultz Memorial International
|style="text-align:left;font-size:88%;" rowspan=3|
 Colorado Springs, Colorado
|-
|Win
|36-11
|align=left| Vladyslav Dombrovskiy
|style="font-size:88%"|TF 11-2
|-
|Win
|35-11
|align=left| Spencer Woods
|style="font-size:88%"|TF 12-2
|-
! style=background:white colspan=7 |
|-
|Loss
|34-11
|align=left| Elvin Mursaliyev
|style="font-size:88%"|2-6
|style="font-size:88%" rowspan=3|October 20–28, 2018
|style="font-size:88%" rowspan=3|2018 World Wrestling Championships
|style="text-align:left;font-size:88%;" rowspan=3|
 Budapest, Hungary
|-
|Win
|34-10
|align=left| Reinier Jiménez
|style="font-size:88%"|8-1
|-
|Win
|33-10
|align=left| Zhang Ridong
|style="font-size:88%"|TF 9-0
|-
! style=background:white colspan=7 |
|-
|Loss
|32-10
|align=left| Khalid Kerchiyev
|style="font-size:88%"|5-5
|style="font-size:88%" |August 18–19, 2018
|style="font-size:88%" |2018 Grand Prix of Germany
|style="text-align:left;font-size:88%;" |
 Dortmund, Germany
|-
! style=background:white colspan=7 |
|-
|Win
|32-9
|align=left| Mason Manville
|style="font-size:88%"|TF 10-0
|style="font-size:88%" rowspan=2|June 21–22, 2018
|style="font-size:88%" rowspan=2|2018 US World Team Trials
|style="text-align:left;font-size:88%;" rowspan=2|
 Tulsa, Oklahoma
|-
|Win
|31-9
|align=left| Mason Manville
|style="font-size:88%"|5-3
|-
! style=background:white colspan=7 |
|-
|Win
|30-9
|align=left| Peyton Walsh
|style="font-size:88%"|TF 8-0
|style="font-size:88%" rowspan=4|April 24–28, 2018
|style="font-size:88%" rowspan=4|2018 US Open Championships
|style="text-align:left;font-size:88%;" rowspan=4|
 Las Vegas, Nevada
|-
|Win
|29-9
|align=left| Jon Jay Chavez
|style="font-size:88%"|TF 10-0
|-
|Win
|28-9
|align=left| Brandon Mueller
|style="font-size:88%"|TF 10-0
|-
|Win
|27-9
|align=left| Dylan Reel
|style="font-size:88%"|Fall
|-
! style=background:white colspan=7 |
|-
|Win
|26-9
|align=left| Jesse Porter
|style="font-size:88%"|TF 13-4
|style="font-size:88%" rowspan=3|March 30–31, 2018
|style="font-size:88%" rowspan=3|2018 Bill Farrell Memorial International
|style="text-align:left;font-size:88%;" rowspan=3|
 New York City, New York
|-
|Win
|25-9
|align=left| Kendrick Sanders
|style="font-size:88%"|9-8
|-
|Win
|24-9
|align=left| Colin Schubert
|style="font-size:88%"|TF 8-0
|-
! style=background:white colspan=7 |
|-
|Win
|22-9
|align=left| Ariel Fis Batista
|style="font-size:88%"|TF 9-1
|style="font-size:88%" rowspan=4|February 15–23, 2018
|style="font-size:88%" rowspan=4|2018 Granma y Cerro Pelado Ranking Series
|style="text-align:left;font-size:88%;" rowspan=4|
 Havana, Cuba
|-
|Win
|21-9
|align=left| Luis Avendaño
|style="font-size:88%"|11-4
|-
|Win
|20-9
|align=left| Juan Angel Escobar
|style="font-size:88%"|TF 8-0
|-
|Win
|19-9
|align=left| Yurisandy Hernandez Rios
|style="font-size:88%"|Fall
|-
! style=background:white colspan=7 |
|-
|Loss
|18-9
|align=left| Viktor Nemeš
|style="font-size:88%"|TF 0-9
|style="font-size:88%" |February 11, 2018
|style="font-size:88%" |2018 USA vs. Serbia Special Dual Meet
|style="text-align:left;font-size:88%;" |
 Boise, Idaho
|-
! style=background:white colspan=7 |
|-
|Loss
|18-8
|align=left| Andrii Antoniuk
|style="font-size:88%"|TF 0-11
|style="font-size:88%" |November 21–26, 2017
|style="font-size:88%" |2017 U23 World Championships
|style="text-align:left;font-size:88%;" |
 Bydgoszcz, Poland
|-
! style=background:white colspan=7 |
|-
|Win
|18-7
|align=left| Thomas Brackett
|style="font-size:88%"|TF 8-0
|style="font-size:88%" rowspan=4|October 7–8, 2017
|style="font-size:88%" rowspan=4|2017 U23 World Team Trials
|style="text-align:left;font-size:88%;" rowspan=4|
 Rochester, Minnesota
|-
|Win
|17-7
|align=left| Thomas Brackett
|style="font-size:88%"|TF 8-0
|-
|Win
|17-7
|align=left| Alex Meyer
|style="font-size:88%"|9-7
|-
|Win
|16-7
|align=left| Zackery Bickford
|style="font-size:88%"|TF 9-0
|-
! style=background:white colspan=7 |
|-
|Loss
|15-7
|align=left| Mason Manville
|style="font-size:88%"|TF 0-8
|style="font-size:88%" rowspan=4|April 26–29, 2017
|style="font-size:88%" rowspan=2|2017 US World Team Trials
|style="text-align:left;font-size:88%;" rowspan=4|
 Las Vegas, Nevada
|-
|Loss
|15-6
|align=left| Mason Manville
|style="font-size:88%"|8-9
|-
|Win
|15-5
|align=left| Jon Jay Chavez
|style="font-size:88%"|16-13
|style="font-size:88%" rowspan=2|2017 US Open Championships
|-
|Win
|14-5
|align=left| Michael Hooker
|style="font-size:88%"|6-2
|-
! style=background:white colspan=7 |
|-
|Win
|13-5
|align=left| Michael Wagner
|style="font-size:88%"|Fall
|style="font-size:88%" rowspan=3|March 11, 2017
|style="font-size:88%" rowspan=3|2017 Grand Prix of Zagreb Open
|style="text-align:left;font-size:88%;" rowspan=3|
 Zagreb, Croatia
|-
|Loss
|12-5
|align=left| Božo Starčević
|style="font-size:88%"|TF 2-10
|-
|Win
|12-4
|align=left| Yuya Maeta
|style="font-size:88%"|Fall
|-
! style=background:white colspan=7 |
|-
|Win
|11-4
|align=left| Jesse Porter
|style="font-size:88%"|5-3
|style="font-size:88%" rowspan=4|February 1–3, 2017
|style="font-size:88%" rowspan=4|2017 Dave Schultz Memorial International
|style="text-align:left;font-size:88%;" rowspan=4|
 Colorado Springs, Colorado
|-
|Win
|10-4
|align=left| Kodai Sakuraba
|style="font-size:88%"|TF 8-0
|-
|Win
|9-4
|align=left| Roni Sosa
|style="font-size:88%"|TF 8-0
|-
|Win
|8-4
|align=left| Michael Donato
|style="font-size:88%"|TF 8-0
|-
! style=background:white colspan=7 |
|-
|Win
|7-4
|align=left| Rustam Rakhmatulaev
|style="font-size:88%"|9-4
|style="font-size:88%" rowspan=4|December 8–9, 2016
|style="font-size:88%" rowspan=4|2016 Club World Championships
|style="text-align:left;font-size:88%;" rowspan=4|
 Budapest, Hungary
|-
|Win
|6-4
|align=left| Butkhuzi Karaia
|style="font-size:88%"|TF 12-4
|-
|Loss
|5-4
|align=left| Martin Szabo
|style="font-size:88%"|10-12
|-
|Loss
|5-3
|align=left| Emrah Kuş
|style="font-size:88%"|TF 2-10
|-
! style=background:white colspan=7 |
|-
|Win
|5-2
|align=left| Alec Ortiz
|style="font-size:88%"|TF 15-5
|style="font-size:88%" rowspan=2|November 10–12, 2016
|style="font-size:88%" rowspan=2|2016 Bill Farrell Memorial International
|style="text-align:left;font-size:88%;" rowspan=2|
 New York City, New York
|-
|Win
|4-2
|align=left| Bradley Dolezal
|style="font-size:88%"|Fall
|-
! style=background:white colspan=7 |
|-
|Loss
|3-2
|align=left| Alec Ortiz
|style="font-size:88%"|12-19
|style="font-size:88%" rowspan=5|January 28–30, 2016
|style="font-size:88%" rowspan=5|2016 Dave Schultz Memorial International
|style="text-align:left;font-size:88%;" rowspan=5|
 Colorado Springs, Colorado
|-
|Win
|3-1
|align=left| Robert Kokesh
|style="font-size:88%"|Fall
|-
|Loss
|2-1
|align=left| Dillon Cowan
|style="font-size:88%"|TF 3-11
|-
|Win
|2-0
|align=left| Barrett Stanghill
|style="font-size:88%"|Fall
|-
|Win
|1-0
|align=left| Alvis Almendra
|style="font-size:88%"|Fall
|-

Awards and honors 

2019
 Pan American Championships (77 kg)
 US Nationals (77 kg)
 US World Team Trials (77 kg)
 US Open (77 kg)
2018
 US World Team Trials (77 kg)
 US Open (77 kg)
2017
 US U23 World Team Trials (80 kg)
 US World Team Trials (75 kg)
 US Open (75 kg)

References

External links
 
 

American male sport wrestlers
1998 births
Living people
People from Bellwood, Illinois
People from Illinois
Sportspeople from Illinois
Amateur wrestlers
Pan American Wrestling Championships medalists
20th-century American people
21st-century American people